Jonilson Clovis Nascimento Breves or Jonilson (born in Pinheiral on November 28, 1978) is an association football player, currently playing for Goiás on loan from Botafogo (SP).

Club statistics

Achievements
 Rio de Janeiro's Cup: 2000, 2002
 Rio de Janeiro State League (2nd division): 2004
 Guanabara Cup: 2005
 Minas Gerais State League: 2006

References

External links

 netvasco.com
 netvasco 2008 stats

1978 births
Living people
Brazilian footballers
Brazilian expatriate footballers
Expatriate footballers in Japan
Campeonato Brasileiro Série A players
J2 League players
Ceará Sporting Club players
Volta Redonda FC players
Botafogo de Futebol e Regatas players
Cruzeiro Esporte Clube players
Vegalta Sendai players
CR Vasco da Gama players
Clube Atlético Mineiro players
Goiás Esporte Clube players

Association football midfielders